Thiago Marcelo Silveira Cocito or simply Cocito (born August 24, 1977 in Bebedouro, São Paulo), is a Brazilian former footballer who last played for Vila Nova-GO.

Cocito previously played for Grêmio and Atletico Paranaense in the Campeonato Brasileiro. He also had a spell with Tenerife in the Spanish Segunda División.

References

1977 births
Living people
People from Bebedouro
Brazilian footballers
La Liga players
CD Tenerife players
Real Murcia players
Botafogo Futebol Clube (SP) players
Club Athletico Paranaense players
Sport Club Corinthians Paulista players
Grêmio Foot-Ball Porto Alegrense players
Fortaleza Esporte Clube players
Avaí FC players
Boavista Sport Club players
Vila Nova Futebol Clube players
Association football midfielders
Footballers from São Paulo (state)